Sir Edward Betham Beetham  (19 February 1905 – 19 February 1979) was a British colonial official who was Resident Commissioner in Swaziland from 1946 to 1950 and in the Bechuanaland Protectorate from 1950 to 1953. 

He was educated at Charterhouse School and Lincoln College, Oxford. He was Governor of the Windward Islands 1953–55 and Governor of Trinidad and Tobago 1955–60, where he presided over the transition to elected internal self-government. Beetham was the last British colonial governor of Trinidad and Tobago of British descent. The Beetham Highway in Port of Spain is named after him.

References

External links

1905 births
1989 deaths
1950s in Bechuanaland Protectorate
Alumni of Lincoln College, Oxford
Colonial Administrative Service officers
Commanders of the Royal Victorian Order
Commissioners of the Bechuanaland Protectorate
Governors of the Windward Islands
Governors of Trinidad and Tobago
Knights Commander of the Order of St Michael and St George
Officers of the Order of the British Empire
People educated at Charterhouse School
Resident Commissioners in Swaziland